Saana is a fell in Enontekiö, Finland. Geologically it is part of the Scandinavian Mountains, and is made of the same kinds of schist and gneiss rock. The mountain was historically considered sacred to the Sami people. The peak is a popular destination for hikers and backpackers because of the sweeping views offered at the summit.

In December 2017, in celebration of the 100th anniversary of Finland's independence, Saana was lit with blue light. The area illuminated covered roughly 2.5 million square meters, making it the largest art illumination in the world.

References

Mountains of Finland
Enontekiö
Landforms of Lapland (Finland)
One-thousanders of Finland